Ranchi Junction railway station, station code RNC, is the A1 category railway station serving the capital city of Ranchi in the Ranchi district in the Indian state of Jharkhand. Ranchi station is also the headquarters of the Ranchi division of the South Eastern Railway zone of the Indian Railways. The Ranchi Junction railway station is connected to most of the major cities in India by the railway network.

Ranchi has trains running frequently to Delhi, Kolkata and Patna. It is one of the top hundred booking stations.

History 
In November 1907, Ranchi was brought onto India's railway map with the Purulia–Ranchi narrow-gauge line. In 1911, it was extended up to Lohardaga.

In 2003, the Ranchi division was carved out from the existing Adra railway division of the South Eastern Railway zone. As of 2012 Ranchi station is being renovated and developed in the lines of Jaipur railway station. The facade of the Ranchi station has been improved in February 2012. In Feb 2012 two new platforms were added to the Ranchi station along with mechanical interlocking system.

Platforms 
There are 6 platforms in Ranchi Junction. The platforms are interconnected with two foot overbridges (FOB) and an escalator.

Connections 
Ranchi Junction is located close to the bus terminal and domestic airport providing transport to important destinations of Jharkhand. Automatic ticket vending machines have been installed to reduce the queue for train tickets on the station. The railway medical unit provides health facilities is located near . The nearest airports to Ranchi Junction are:

Birsa Munda Airport, Ranchi  
Gaya Airport 
Lok Nayak Jayaprakash Airport, Patna 
Netaji Subhash Chandra Bose International Airport, Kolkata  
Kazi Nazrul Islam Airport, Durgapur 243 Kilometres (150.9 mi)
Deoghar Airport, Deoghar 247 Kilometres (153.4 mi)
Sonari Airport, Jamshedpur 122 Kilometres (75.8 mi)
Bokaro Airport, Bokaro Steel City 105 Kilometres (65.2 mi) (Under Construction)

See also 

 Ranchi
 Indian Railways

References

External links 

 Ranchi Junction map
 Official website of the Ranchi district

Railway stations in Ranchi district
Transport in Ranchi
Buildings and structures in Ranchi
Ranchi railway division
Railway stations opened in 1908
1908 establishments in India